Findo Gask were an electropop band from Glasgow, Scotland, comprising Gerard Black (Kaoss Pad, Guitar, Vocals & Synths), Michael Marshall (Guitar, Drums, Synths & Programming), Gregory Williams (Bass, Vocals, Synths & Guitar) and Gavin Thomson (Synths, Vocals, Programming, Guitar, Bass).

Discography

Singles
"Findo Gask"/"Errors" split 7-inch (2005)
"Va Va Va" (2007)
"One Eight Zero" (2008)

References

External links
Findo Gask's MySpace Page
Findo Gask's Last.fm Page
OSCarr releases Gindo Gask Findo Gask press release, 2007

Findo Gask on the Under The Radar blog from the Scotsman

Musical groups from Glasgow
Scottish indie rock groups
Musical groups established in 2005